Iraq's 18 governorates are subdivided into 120 districts (kaza).
The district usually bears the same name as the district capital. 

The districts are listed below, by governorate (with capital in parentheses):

Al Anbar Governorate

 Al-Qa'im District (Al-Qa'im) 
 Ar-Rutba District (Ar-Rutba)
 Anah District (Anah)
 Fallujah District (Fallujah)
 Haditha District (Haditha)
 Hīt District (Hīt)
 Ramadi District (Ramadi)
 Rawah District (Rawah)

Muthanna Governorate

 Al-Khidhir District (Al-Khidhir) 
 Al-Rumaitha District (Al-Rumaitha) 
 Al-Salman District (Al-Salman) 
 Al-Samawa District (Samawa)

Qadisiyyah Governorate

 Afaq District (Afaq) 
 Al-Shamiya District (Al-Shamiya) 
 Diwaniya District (Diwaniya) 
 Hamza District (Hamza)

Babil Governorate

 Al-Mahawil District (Al-Mahawil) 
 Al-Musayab District (Al-Musayab) 
 Hashimiya District (Hashimiya) 
 Hilla District (Hilla)

Baghdad Governorate

 Administrative Districts in Baghdad City
Rusafa
Adhamiyah
Sadr City (formerly Thawra District (Revolution District)
9 Nissan (New Baghdad) 
Karadah
Al-Za'franiya
Karkh 
Kadhimyah
Mansour
Al Rashid 
 Administrative Districts in Baghdad Suburban
Abu Ghraib District 
Al Istiqlal District
Al-Mada'in District  
Mahmudiya District (Mahmudiya) 
Taji District
Al Tarmia District

Basra Governorate

 Abu Al-Khaseeb District (Abu Al-Khaseeb) 
 Al-Midaina District (Al-Midaina) 
 Al-Qurna District (Al-Qurna) 
 Al-Zubair District (Al-Zubair) 
 Basrah District (Basrah) 
 al-Faw District (al-Faw)

Dhi Qar Governorate

 Al-Chibayish District (Al-Chibayish) 
 Al-Rifa'i District (Al-Rifa'i) 
 Al-Shatra District (Al-Shatra) 
 Nassriya District (Nassriya) 
 Suq Al-Shoyokh District (Suq Al-Shoyokh)

Diyala Governorate

 Al-Khalis District (Al-Khalis) 
 Al-Muqdadiya District (Al-Muqdadiya) 
 Baladrooz District (Baladrooz) 
 Ba'quba District (Ba'quba) 
 Khanaqin District (Khanaqin) 
 Kifri District (Kifri)

Karbala Governorate

 Ain Al-Tamur District (Ayn al-Tamr) 
 Al-Hindiya District (Al-Hindiya) 
 Kerbala District (Kerbala)

Kirkuk Governorate

(From 1976 to mid-2006 called At-Ta'mim)
 Al-Hawiga District (Al-Hawiga) 
 Daquq District (Daquq) 
 Kirkuk District (Kirkuk) 
 Al-Dibs District (Al-Dibs)

Maysan Governorate

 Ali Al-Gharbi District (Ali Al-Gharbi) 
 Al-Kahla District (Al-Kahla) 
 Al-Maimouna District (Al-Maimouna) 
 Al-Mejar Al-Kabi District (Al-Mejar Al-Kabi) 
 Amara District (Amarah) 
 Qal'at Saleh District (Qal'at Saleh)

Najaf Governorate

 Al-Manathera District (Al-Manathera) 
 Kufa District (Kufa) 
 Najaf District (Najaf)
 Najaf Abu Sakhir (Abu Sakhir)

Nineveh Governorate

Note that northern Sinjar, northern Tel Afar, northern Tel Keppe, Akre, and northern Shekhan districts are currently under the Kurdistan Region's de facto control.
Akre District (Akre)
Al-Ba'aj District (Al-Ba'aj)
Al-Hamdaniya District (Bakhdida)
Hatra District (Hatra)
Mosul District (Mosul)
Shekhan District (Ain Sifni)
Sinjar District (Sinjar)
Tel Afar District (Tal Afar)
Tel Keppe District (Tel Keppe)

Saladin Governorate

Al-Daur District (Al-Daur) 
Al-Shirqat District (Al-Shirqat) 
Baiji District (Baiji) 
Balad District (Balad) 
Samarra District (Samarra) 
Tikrit District (Tikrit) 
Tooz District (Tuz Khurmatu)
Dujail District (Dujail)

Wasit Governorate

 Al-Aziziyah District (Al-Aziziyah)
 Al-Hai District (Al-Hai) 
 Al-Na'maniya District (Al-Na'maniya) 
 Al-Suwaira District (Al-Suwaira) 
 Badra District (Badra) 
 Kut District (Kut)

Kurdistan Region

Dohuk Governorate

Dohuk Governorate is part of Iraqi Kurdistan. 
 Amadiya District (Amadiya) 
 Dahuk District (Dahuk) 
 Sumel District (Sumel) 
 Zakho District (Zakho)

Erbil Governorate

Erbil Governorate is part of Iraqi Kurdistan, while the status of the southern Makhmur District is contested.
 Erbil District (71)
 Koisanjaq District (80)
 Shaqlawa District (89), cities are Salahaddin and Hareer
 Soran District (94), cities are Town of Soran, Rawanduz and Diana
 Makhmur District
 Mergasur District (83)
 Choman District (66)
Ankawa District

Sulaymaniyah Governorate

Sulaymaniyah Governorate is part of Iraqi Kurdistan.

 Pshdar District (Qaladiza) 
 Chamchamal District (Chamchamal) 
 Darbandokeh District (Darbandikhan) 
 Dokan District (Dokan) 
 Kalar District (Kalar) 
 Rania District (Rania) 
 Sharbazher District (Sharbazher) 
 Sulaymaniya District (Sulaymaniya)
 Saidsadiq District (Saidsadiq)
 Sharazoor District (Zarayan) 
 Penjwin District (Penjwin)
 Mawat District (Mawat)
 Qaradagh District (Qaradagh)

Halabja Governorate

Halabja Governorate is part of Iraqi Kurdistan and still officially a part of Sulaymaniyah Governorate.
 Halabja
 Sirwan
 Khurmal District (Khurmal)
 Byara District (Byara)

See also
 List of postal codes in Iraq
 Governorates of Iraq

Sources
 humanitarianinfo district map 
 humanitarianinfo governorate map

 
Subdivisions of Iraq
Iraq, Districts
Iraq 2
Districts, Iraq
Iraq geography-related lists